No. 613 (City of Manchester) Squadron was an Auxiliary Air Force later Royal Auxiliary Air Force squadron formed on 1 February 1939 at the then new municipal airport at Ringway, nine miles south of Manchester. The squadron served at first in the army cooperation role, and later during the Second World War became a tactical bomber unit. After the war the squadron reformed as a fighter unit and as such flew until its last disbandment in March 1957.

History

Formation and early years
The squadron was formed at RAF Ringway on 1 February 1939 in the army cooperation role as part of No. 22 (Army Co-Operation) Group. It was initially intended that the title 'East Lancashire' Squadron would be used, but this could have been confused with No. 611 Squadron RAF, named 'West Lancashire', based at Liverpool's airport at Speke. The link with the City of Manchester was therefore created.
The squadron was initially equipped with Hawker Hinds. On 2 October 1939, the squadron moved from RAF Ringway to RAF Odiham near Basingstoke and Hawker Hectors were delivered to the unit during November to replace the Hinds. From 2 April 1940, Westland Lysanders served alongside the Hectors. The Hectors and Lysanders were used to dive-bomb German positions and drop supplies to friendly troops near Calais during the late May 1940 Dunkirk evacuation.

Tactical reconnaissance operations
In August 1941 the squadron became a tactical reconnaissance unit and it began re-equipping with the faster Curtiss Tomahawk. It re-equipped with the early Allison V-1710 powered Mark I version of the North American Mustang in April 1942, continuing to operate within RAF Army Cooperation Command. During Spring and Summer 1943 the Mustangs were flown on "Lagoon" low level shipping reconnaissance flights over the North Sea to near the Dutch Coast, calling in heavy Coastal Command strike aircraft when enemy shipping was located.

Mosquito operations

On 15 October 1943 the squadron moved to RAF Lasham, Hampshire and began to equip with the de Havilland Mosquito when it joined No. 2 Group as a day and night tactical strike unit. The squadron mainly flew night intrusion sorties, but also took part in daylight precision actions such as that against the Dutch Central Population Registry building on 11 April 1944, where the Germans held their Dutch Gestapo records.
The squadron disbanded at Cambrai-Epinoy, France, on 7 August 1945 by being renumbered to No. 69 Squadron.

Postwar operations

The squadron reformed on 10 May 1946 at RAF Ringway (now Manchester Airport), as a fighter squadron within Reserve Command. The unit's home was in Ringway's Hangar No.7, which had been completed for the squadron in spring 1940, a few months after leaving the airport for wartime service elsewhere. No. 613 Squadron was initially equipped with Supermarine Spitfire FR.14s, replacing these in November 1948 by the higher performance Mark F.22s. North American Harvard aircraft were used in the dual training role. The Spitfires and their volunteer flying and ground crews were frequently detached to RAF Horsham St Faith, Norfolk, and other RAF stations, for weekend exercises alongside regular RAF squadrons.

In April 1950, No. 613 Squadron was transferred to become a unit within RAF Fighter Command. No. 613 re-equipped during February 1951 with the jet-powered De Havilland Vampire FB.5. The Harvard T.2s were replaced by Gloster Meteor T.7 twin-seat trainers. Initial training with the new jet aircraft was carried out at Avros nearby Woodford Aerodrome, with its longer runway, by courtesy of the squadron's honorary air commodore, Sir Roy Dobson, 613's commanding officer, Squadron Leader Jack Wales DFC, a test pilot for Avros, flew the unit's only Vampire FB.9, WR257 'A' between June 1954 and his death in December 1956 when flight testing the prototype Avro Shackleton MR.3. WR257 had been built by Fairey Aviation at Ringway – the only example of a jet aircraft being both built and based at the airfield.
After six further years of peacetime exercises, often detaching to operational RAF fighter stations, the unit disbanded for the final time at Ringway on 10 March 1957, on the same day as all other Royal Auxiliary Air Force flying units.

Aircraft operated

Commanding officers

See also
 RAF Ringway
 Tony Murray (businessman)

References

Citations

Bibliography

External links

 squadron histories nos. 611–620 sqn
 Official 613 Squadron history

613
Military units and formations established in 1939
Aircraft squadrons of the Royal Air Force in World War II
History of Manchester
Military units and formations disestablished in 1957